KQPW may refer to:

 KLBN, a radio station (101.9 FM) licensed to Fresno, California, United States, which used the call sign KQPW from December 1990 to October 1993
 KQPW-LP, a defunct FM Christian radio station in West Quincy, Missouri, United States